is a daily newspaper published in Kyoto, Japan, and the company publishing that newspapers is also called . Kyoto Shimbun has two headquarters in Kyoto and Ōtsu, and three branch offices in Kumiyama, Tokyo and Osaka.

Further reading

External links
 The Kyoto Shimbun News
 Kyoto Shimbun

Daily newspapers published in Japan
Newspaper companies of Japan
Mass media in Kyoto
Newspapers established in 1879
1879 establishments in Japan